Mighty Little Bheem is a computer animated children's television series, Netflix's first animated series from India and the fourth spin-off of the Chhota Bheem series, following Mighty Raju, Arjun - Prince of Bali and Super Bheem. It follows an innocent but super-strong toddler, Little Bheem, on his mischievous adventures in a small Indian town. The toddler is a baby version of the mythological-inspired 9-year-old character from the popular Indian series action comedy animated series Chhota Bheem which has aired on Turner Broadcasting's Pogo TV channel from 2008.

Production
In 2016, after the launch of Netflix in India, Aram Yacoubian, director of kids and family content at the US streaming service, first met Rajiv Chilaka of Green Gold Animation, and agreed on a series that would target the age group of 6–11. To make it universal, the decision was made to make it non-verbal. The show was in production for 18 months, starting in July 2017 and led by Green Gold's teams in Hyderabad and Mumbai.

Green Gold Animations has become one of India's largest toon companies, with studios in Hyderabad, Mumbai and Kolkata, as well as international outposts in Los Angeles, Singapore and the Philippines.

Series overview

Release
Mighty Little Bheem season 1 was released on 12 April 2019 on Netflix. Season 2 was released on August 30, 2019. A third season was released on September 18, 2020.

Specials
A special collection of three episodes titled Mighty Little Bheem: Diwali was made available on October 27, 2019, on the occasion of Diwali.

A second special collection of three episodes titled Mighty Little Bheem: Festival of Colors was made available on March 5, 2020.

A third special collection of three episodes titled Mighty Little Bheem: Kite Festival was made available on January 8, 2021.

A fourth special of short film titled Mighty Little Bheem: I Love Taj Mahal was made available on May 30, 2022.

See also
Chhota Bheem
Arjun: Prince of Bali
Super Bheem

References

External links
 
 
 

2019 Indian television series debuts
2010s animated television series
2020s animated television series
Animated television series about children
Chhota Bheem
Green Gold Animation
Indian children's animated comedy television series
Indian computer-animation
Indian television series distributed by Netflix
Indian television spin-offs
Animated television series without speech
Animated preschool education television series
2010s preschool education television series
2020s preschool education television series
Animated television series by Netflix
Television series based on Mahabharata
Animated web series